AST Central United
Adidas
Gold Star Sogi
Gruz Azull
Kiwi FC
Konica
Lepea
Lupe
Sinamoga
Vaivase-tai

Samoa
 
Football clubs
football clubs